The Old Masonic Hall (also known as Old Masonic Lodge Building) is a historic building in Bellville, Texas.  Constructed in 1886, it was listed on the National Register of Historic Places in 1986. Today, the building houses the headquarters of the Bellville Historical Society.

See also

National Register of Historic Places listings in Austin County, Texas

References

Buildings and structures in Austin County, Texas
Former Masonic buildings in Texas
Masonic buildings completed in 1886
Clubhouses on the National Register of Historic Places in Texas
National Register of Historic Places in Austin County, Texas